Bordellet is a 1972 Danish theatrical sex comedy film made by pornographic pioneer Ole Ege and was Denmark's first full-length hardcore pornographic feature film.

The story is set around 1900 and involves a young girl, a brothel, and a hidden treasure.

Typically for Danish hardcore sex comedies of the 1970s, the production was not blocked from hiring people from the mainstream film industry. The crew included cinematographer Morten Arnfred, also known as co-director of the TV miniseries The Kingdom (1994). The cast includes comedian Gotha Andersen, a popular mainstream film and television actor, and popular singer Inger-Lise Gaarde. The film started a decade-long run of Danish hardcore sex comedies.

Release party
At the film's release party, Danish millionaire Simon Spies showed up, took off his clothes and started having sex with members of the film's female cast in front of the press. The resulting photos naturally made front-page news and are still reprinted frequently.

See also

Bedside-films
Zodiac-films

Further reading
Ebbe Villadsen: Danish Erotic Film Classics (2005)

References

External links
Bordellet  at International Movies Database
Bordellet af DFI.dk

1972 films
1970s Danish-language films
Films set in the 1900s
1970s sex comedy films
1972 comedy films
Danish sex comedy films